Vajargah (also Romanized as Vājārgāh; also known as Owndīm Sarā) is a city in Kelachay District, Rudsar County, Gilan Province, Iran.  At the 2006 census, its population was 2,974, in 893 families.

References

Populated places in Rudsar County

Cities in Gilan Province